S5-HVS1  is an A-type main-sequence star notable as the fastest one detected as of November 2019, and has been determined to be traveling at . The star is in the Grus (or Crane) constellation in the southern sky, and about 29,000 light-years from Earth. According to astronomers, S5-HVS1 was ejected from the Milky Way galaxy after interacting with Sagittarius A*, the supermassive black hole at the center of the galaxy. It is possible that it was originally part of a binary system that was tidally disrupted by the supermassive black hole, causing it to be ejected. If this is the case, that it was flung out of the galaxy by the central black hole, it is then the first example of a star that has undergone the Hills mechanism.

The star's discovery has been credited to Sergey Koposov, assistant professor of physics at Carnegie Mellon University, as part of the Southern Stellar Stream Spectroscopic Survey (S5). The designation HVS1 refers to hypervelocity stars (HVS).

See also
 List of star extremes
 SDSS J090745.0+024507 – another fast moving star
 US 708 – another fast moving star

References

External links
  
 

Runaway stars
Hypervelocity stars
Grus (constellation)
Astronomical objects discovered in 2019